Nizhniye Lemezy (Tübänge Lämäź) is a rural locality (a selo) and the administrative centre of Lemezinsky Selsoviet, Iglinsky District, Bashkortostan, Russia. The population was 707 as of 2010. There are 10 streets.

Geography 
Nizhniye Lemezy is located 62 km southeast of Iglino (the district's administrative centre) by road. Ulu-Yelan is the nearest rural locality.

References 

Rural localities in Iglinsky District
Ufa Governorate